Martina Hingis was the defending champion but did not compete that year.

Amanda Coetzer won in the final 6–3, 6–4 against Irina Spîrlea.

Seeds
A champion seed is indicated in bold text while text in italics indicates the round in which that seed was eliminated. The top eight seeds received a bye to the second round.

  Lindsay Davenport (quarterfinals)
  Jana Novotná (third round)
  Monica Seles (semifinals)
  Amanda Coetzer (champion)
  Mary Pierce (second round)
  Iva Majoli (second round)
  Arantxa Sánchez-Vicario (second round)
  Conchita Martínez (second round)
  Irina Spîrlea (final)
  Nathalie Tauziat (second round)
  Sandrine Testud (first round)
  Anke Huber (third round)
  Ai Sugiyama (first round)
  Patty Schnyder (quarterfinals)
  Lisa Raymond (semifinals)
  Natasha Zvereva (third round)

Draw

Finals

Top half

Section 1

Section 2

Bottom half

Section 3

Section 4

External links
 1998 Family Circle Cup draw

Charleston Open
Family Circle Cup